Myles Peter Lee (born 1953) is an Irish businessman. He was the chief executive (CEO) of CRH plc, an Irish multinational diversified building materials company, until his retirement on 1 January 2014, when he was succeeded by Albert Manifold. CRH is Ireland's largest company; its primary listing is on the London Stock Exchange and is a constituent of the FTSE 100 Index.

Early life
Lee attended Newbridge College, a private secondary school in Co. Kildare.
He has a bachelor's degree in civil engineering from University College Cork. Lee joined KPMG, qualifying as a chartered accountant in 1977, later becoming FCA (fellow chartered accountant).

Career
He became chief executive of CRH in January 2009, having been finance director from November 2003. He joined CRH in 1982, having previously worked in a professional accountancy practice and in the oil industry.

References

External links
CRH Board of Directors-Myles Lee

1953 births
Living people
Alumni of University College Cork
People educated at Newbridge College
Irish businesspeople
Irish chief executives
Irish accountants